The Sun on the Roof of the World is a Chinese drama film released in 1992 and directed by Xie Fei. A major theme of the film is the industrialization of Tibet.

Plot
Fang Jingsheng is a young drilling engineer from Beijing who is leaving for Tibet to work on a geothermal development project. His girlfriend Milan, a postgraduate student wants him to return to China and marry her. He goes back against the will of his father, who is the project manager.

After arriving in Beijing, Milan informs him that she wants to leave for the US immediately after their marriage. Fang decides not to marry her and returns to Tibet. Meanwhile, Milan becomes pregnant and goes to the US, where she arranges travel documents for Fang. In Tibet, a blowout occurs on the project and Fang sacrifices himself in an effort to stop the impending explosion.

Cast
Guoqing Liang
Huang Jiao
Ai Liya as Buddhist nun

References

1992 films
Chinese drama films
1990s Mandarin-language films
Films directed by Xie Fei
Films about Tibet
1992 drama films